Leicester North West was a borough constituency in the city of Leicester.  It returned one Member of Parliament (MP)  to the House of Commons of the Parliament of the United Kingdom.

The constituency was created for the 1950 general election, and abolished for the February 1974 general election.

Boundaries 
The County Borough of Leicester wards of Abbey, Newton, St Margaret's, and Westcotes.

Members of Parliament

Election results

Elections in the 1950s

Elections in the 1960s 

}

Elections in the 1970s

References 

Parliamentary constituencies in Leicestershire (historic)
Constituencies of the Parliament of the United Kingdom established in 1950
Constituencies of the Parliament of the United Kingdom disestablished in 1974
Politics of Leicester